Ebrahim Ali Essop-Adam (born 16 November 1968) is a former Zimbabwean cricketer. A right-handed batsman and right-arm off break bowler, he played one ODI for Zimbabwe in 1992. He also played first-class cricket, representing Mashonaland in the Logan Cup during the mid-1990s.

Born in Salisbury (now Harare), Essop-Adam is of Indian descent. ESPNcricinfo's Martin Williamson described Essop-Adam as a diminutive batsman and an athletic fielder.

References

External links

1968 births
Living people
Zimbabwe One Day International cricketers
Zimbabwean cricketers
Mashonaland cricketers
Cricketers from Harare
Zimbabwean people of Indian descent